The Lost Art of Longing is the thirteenth studio album by electronica artist BT. Two singles for the album, "1AM in Paris / The War" and "No Warning Lights", were released on June 19 and July 17, respectively. The album was announced on July 17 before Transeau made an official announcement on his Instagram and Facebook pages.

Background
The Lost Art of Longing is considered a resurgence of electronic dance music for BT, akin to some of Transeau's previous releases, such as Ima, ESCM, Movement in Still Life, Emotional Technology, These Hopeful Machines and A Song Across Wires.

Transeau said of the significance and symbolism of the album:

Track listing

References

External links
Official website

2020 albums
BT (musician) albums
Black Hole Recordings albums